Stefan Nagel is a German-American financial economist and the Fama Family Professor of Finance at the University of Chicago Booth School of Business. He is also a research associate at the National Bureau of Economic Research (Cambridge, MA) and a research fellow at the Centre of Economic Policy Research (London, UK). After completing a degree at the University of Trier, Nagel earned his PhD at London Business School. Prior to joining the University of Chicago faculty, he previously taught at the Stanford Graduate School of Business and the University of Michigan Ross School of Business. 

He was appointed as editor of the Journal of Finance in 2016.

In 2004 he won the Smith Breeden best paper prize (Journal of Finance) for his article "Hedge Funds and the Technology Bubble".
He won the Fama/DFA best paper prize (Journal of Financial Economics) as a co-author twice, in 2006 for the article "The Conditional CAPM Does Not Explain Asset Pricing Anomalies" and in 2020 for the article "Shrinking the cross section".

References

External links 
 Faculty website
 Google scholar page
 SSRN author page

Living people
Alumni of London Business School
University of Michigan faculty
Stanford University Graduate School of Business faculty
Year of birth missing (living people)
The Journal of Finance editors
University of Trier alumni
German emigrants to the United States
German economists
21st-century American economists
German expatriates in the United Kingdom